Morris Holt (August 7, 1937 – February 21, 2013), known as Magic Slim, was an American blues singer and guitarist. Born at Torrance, near Grenada, Mississippi, the son of sharecroppers, he followed blues greats such as Muddy Waters and Howlin' Wolf to Chicago, developing his own place in the Chicago blues scene.

In 2017, Magic Slim was posthumously inducted in to the Blues Hall of Fame.

Biography
Magic Slim was forced to give up playing the piano when he lost his little finger in a cotton gin mishap.  He moved first to nearby Grenada. He first came to Chicago in 1955 with his friend and mentor Magic Sam. The elder (by six months) Magic (Sam) let the younger Magic (Slim) play bass with his band and gave him his nickname.

At first Slim was not rated very highly by his peers. He returned to Mississippi to work and got his younger brother Nick interested in playing bass. By 1965 he was back in Chicago and in 1970 Nick joined him in his band, the Teardrops. They played in the dim, smoke-filled juke joints popular in Chicago in the 1970s on bandstands barely large enough to hold the musicians.

Slim's recording career began in 1966 with the song "Scufflin'", followed by a number of singles into the mid-1970s. He recorded his first album in 1977, Born Under a Bad Sign, for the French label MCM. During the 1980s, Slim released albums for Alligator, Rooster Blues and Wolf Records and won his first W. C. Handy Award. In 1980 he recorded a cover version of "Mustang Sally".

In 1983, the guitarist John Primer joined the Teardrops and played with the group for 13 years. Releases included Spider in My Stew on Wolf Records – which included the title track "Spider in My Stew", composed by Willie Dixon and originally recorded by Buster Benton - and a 1996 Blind Pig release, Scufflin''', which presented the post-Primer lineup with the recent addition of the guitarist and singer Jake Dawson.

In 1994, Slim moved to Lincoln, Nebraska, where the Zoo Bar had been booking him for years. He was frequently accompanied by his son Shawn Holt, an accomplished guitarist and singer.

In 2003, Magic Slim and the Teardrops won the W. C. Handy Award as Blues Band of the Year for the sixth time. They released a live performance on CD and DVD in August 2005 entitled Anything Can Happen.

Slim died at a hospital in Philadelphia, Pennsylvania, on February 21, 2013, at age 75. He had health problems that had worsened while he was on tour several weeks earlier. His manager had stated that bleeding ulcers had sent Slim to the hospital, but that he also suffered from heart, lung and kidney problems.

In May 2013, Magic Slim was posthumously awarded another Blues Music Award in the category Traditional Blues Male Artist. In 2017, Magic Slim was posthumously inducted in to the Blues Hall of Fame.

Discography

 1977: Born Under a Bad Sign (MCM, reissued by Storyville)
 1978: Let Me Love You (MCM)
 1978: Highway Is My Home (Black & Blue, reissued by Evidence)
 1978: Living Chicago Blues, Vol. 2 (Alligator)
 1980: Liv 'n Blue (Candy Apple CA)
 1980: In the Heart of the Blues (Isabel)
 1980: Doing Fine (Isabel)
 1982: Raw Magic (Alligator)
 1982: Essential Boogie (Rooster Blues)
 1982: Grand Slam (Rooster Blues)
 1987: Live at B.L.U.E.S., with John Primer (Blues R&B)
 1990: Gravel Road (Blind Pig)
 1992: 44 Blues, with John Primer and Bonnie Lee (Wolf Records) 
 1992: Spider in My Stew, with John Primer (Wolf Records) 
 1992: Blues Behind Closed Doors, with John Primer and Billy Branch (Wolf Records) 
 1993: Magic Slim & the Teardrops (Wolf Records)
 1994: Chicago Blues Session, Vol. 10 (Wolf Records)
 1994: Don't Tell Me About Your Troubles (Wolf Records)
 1995: Zoo Bar Collection, Vol. 3 (Wolf Records)
 1995: Alone & Unplugged 1995: Born on a Bad Sign 1996: Scufflin (Tone Zone Studios)
 1997: Let Me Love You 1998: Zoo Bar Collection, Vol. 4: Spider in My Stew 1998: See What You're Doin' to Me (Wolf Records)
 1998: Black Tornado (Blind Pig)
 2000: Snakebite (Blind Pig)
 2000: Chicago Blues Session, Vol. 18: Live on the Road (Wolf Records)
 2002: Blue Magic, produced by Popa Chubby, who played 2nd guitar on some tracks (Blind Pig)
 2005: Anything Can Happen, live album (Blind Pig)
 2006: Tin Pan Alley, compilation album (Wolf Records)
 2006: That Ain't Right, Magic Slim & the Teardrops / Joe Carter with Sunnyland Slim, recorded in 1977 (Delmark)
 2007: The Essential Magic Slim (Blind Pig)
 2008: Midnight Blues, with James Cotton, Elvin Bishop, Lil' Ed Williams, Lonnie Brooks and Otis Clay, produced by Nick Moss (Blind Pig)
 2009: Rough Dried Woman, compilation album, recorded 1986–1992 (Wolf Records) 
 2010: Raising the Bar 2012: Bad Boy (Blind Pig)
 2014: Pure Magic'' (Wolf)

See also
 List of blues musicians
 Chicago Blues Festival
 San Francisco Blues Festival
 Sweden Rock Festival
 Notodden Blues Festival
 List of stage names

References

External links

Magic Slim's Myspace Page
Slim biography at blindpigrecords.com
 Illustrated Magic Slim discography

1937 births
2013 deaths
American blues guitarists
American male guitarists
American blues singers
Blues musicians from Mississippi
People from Yalobusha County, Mississippi
Guitarists from Mississippi
20th-century American guitarists
20th-century American male musicians
Black & Blue Records artists
Alligator Records artists
Blind Pig Records artists